Yelena Grigoryeva (born 26 November 1974) is a Belarusian figure skater. She competed in the pairs event at the 1994 Winter Olympics.

References

1974 births
Living people
Belarusian female pair skaters
Olympic figure skaters of Belarus
Figure skaters at the 1994 Winter Olympics
Figure skaters from Minsk